Antonio de Obregón was a Spanish writer and film director. He was a supporter of the Falange movement.

Selected filmography
 House of Cards (1943)
 The Butterfly That Flew Over the Sea (1948)
 The Maragatan Sphinx (1950)

References

Bibliography 
 Nicolás Fernández-Medina & Maria Truglio. Modernism and the Avant-garde Body in Spain and Italy. Routledge, 2016.

External links 
 

Year of birth unknown
Year of death unknown
Spanish film directors
Spanish screenwriters